Eight Pieces for Four Timpani is a collection of short pieces by Elliott Carter for solo timpani – four drums played by one musician. Six of the pieces were composed in 1949. Two new pieces were added in 1966, and the rest were revised in collaboration with percussionist Jan Williams. Carter wrote the pieces as studies in tempo modulation and the use of four-note chords. They are a collection rather than a suite, as Carter suggested no more than four be performed at once. The pieces make heavy use of extended techniques, including playing with the back end of the timpani sticks, varying the beating spot on the drumhead, glissandos, and sympathetic vibration.

Pieces

Saeta
The "Saëta" (arrow) is named after a type of Andalusian song. It is based on rhythmic acceleration.

Moto perpetuo
"Moto perpetuo" (perpetual motion) is a quick moving piece with a constant pulse. It is played with thin rattan shafts with moleskin on the ends rather than conventional timpani sticks.

Adagio
"Adagio", composed in 1966, is written for pedal timpani, and explores the many effects possible by changing the pitch of the drum while playing.

Recitative
"Recitative" is a dramatic, slow piece that consists of three different elements: a tremolo, a bolero rhythm, and an irregular pulse.

Improvisation
"Improvisation" uses a set of chromatic pitches with octave displacement and a constantly varying tempo.

Canto
"Canto", added in 1966, is played with snare drum sticks, and uses pedal timpani to imply a continuous melodic line.

Canaries
"Canaries", a reference to the French Baroque dance, consists of contrapuntal dance rhythms played at different speeds.

March
"March" is a contrapuntal piece: one march rhythm is played with the head of one mallet, while another is played at a different speed with the back of the other mallet. It is perhaps the most-often played piece of the suite, and the only one ever specifically asked for in orchestral auditions.

References

 
 
 

Compositions by Elliott Carter
Compositions for timpani
1950 compositions
1966 compositions